The University of California, Irvine (UCI or UC Irvine) is a public land-grant research university in Irvine, California. One of the ten campuses of the University of California system, UCI offers 87 undergraduate degrees and 129 graduate and professional degrees, and roughly 30,000 undergraduates and 6,000 graduate students are enrolled at UCI as of Fall 2019. The university is classified among "R1: Doctoral Universities – Very high research activity", and had $523.7 million in research and development expenditures in 2021. UCI became a member of the Association of American Universities in 1996. The university was rated as one of the "Public Ivies” in 1985 and 2001 surveys comparing publicly funded universities the authors claimed provide an education comparable to the Ivy League.

The university also administers the UC Irvine Medical Center, a large teaching hospital in Orange, and its affiliated health sciences system; the University of California, Irvine, Arboretum; and a portion of the University of California Natural Reserve System. UC Irvine set up the first Earth System Science Department in the United States.

UC Irvine was one of three new UC campuses established in the 1960s to accommodate growing enrollments across the UC system. A site in Orange County was identified in 1959, and in the following year the Irvine Company sold the University of California  of land for one dollar to establish the new campus. President Lyndon B. Johnson dedicated the campus in 1964, a fact commemorated with the delivery of a commencement speech by President Barack Obama fifty years later. 

As of January 2022, there have been 8 Nobel Prize laureates, 7 Pulitzer Prize winners, 6 MacArthur "Genius Grant" recipients, 37 Guggenheim Fellows, and 1 Turing Award winner affiliated with the university as alumni, faculty or researchers.

The UC Irvine Anteaters currently compete in the NCAA Division I as members of the Big West Conference. During the early years of the school's existence, the teams played at the NCAA Division II level. The Anteaters have won 28 national championships in nine different team sports, 64 Anteaters have won individual national championships, and 53 Anteaters have competed in the Olympics, winning a total of 33 Olympic medals.

History

Early years 
The University of California, Irvine (with San Diego and Santa Cruz) was one of three new University of California campuses established in the 1960s under the California Master Plan for Higher Education. During the 1950s, the University of California saw the need for the new campuses to handle the expected increase in enrollment from the post-war baby boom. One of the new campuses was to be in the Los Angeles area; the location selected was Irvine Ranch, an area of agricultural land bisecting Orange County from north to south. This site was chosen to accommodate the county's growing population, complement the growth of nearby UCLA and UC Riverside, and allow for the construction of a master planned community in the surrounding area.

On June 20, 1964, U.S. President Lyndon B. Johnson dedicated UC Irvine before a crowd of 15,000 people, and on October 4, 1965 the campus began operations with 1,589 students, 241 staff members, 119 faculty, and 43 teaching assistants. However, many of UCI's buildings were still under construction and landscaping was still in progress, with the campus only at 75% completion. By June 25, 1966, UCI held its first Commencement with fourteen students, which conferred ten Bachelor of Arts degrees, three Master of Arts degrees, and one Doctor of Philosophy degree.

Development and recent history
Unlike most other University of California campuses, UCI was not named for the city it was built in; at the time of the university's founding (1965), the current city of Irvine (incorporated in 1971) did not exist. The name "Irvine" is a reference to James Irvine, a landowner who administered the  Irvine Ranch. In 1960, The Irvine Company sold  of the Irvine Ranch to the University of California for one dollar, since company policy prohibited the donation of property to a public entity.  On campus, UC Irvine's first Chancellor, Daniel G. Aldrich selected a wide variety of Mediterranean-climate flora and fauna, feeling that it served an "aesthetic, environmental, and educational [purpose]."  To plan the remainder of the ranch, the University hired William Pereira and Associates. Pereira intended for the UC Irvine campus to complement the neighboring community, and it became clear that the original  grant would not suffice.  In 1964, the University purchased an additional  in 1964 for housing and commercial developments.

Much of the land that was not purchased by UCI (which is now occupied by the cities of Irvine, Tustin, and Newport Beach) remains held by The Irvine Company, but the completion of the University rapidly drove the development of Orange County.  The City of Irvine became incorporated and established in 1971 and 1975, respectively.  UCI remains the second-largest employer in Orange County, with an annual economic impact of $5 billion.

Aldrich developed the campus' first academic plan around a College of Arts, Letters, and Science, a Graduate School of Administration, and a School of Engineering. The College of Arts, Letters, and Science was composed of twenty majors in five "Divisions": Biological Sciences, Fine Arts, Humanities, Physical Sciences, and Social Sciences (which transformed into the present-day "Schools"). In 1967, the California College of Medicine (originally a school of osteopathy founded in 1896 and the oldest continuously operating medical college in the Southwest) became part of UC Irvine.  In 1976, plans to establish an on-campus hospital were set aside, with the university instead purchasing the Orange County Medical Center (renamed the UC Irvine Medical Center) around 12 miles from UC Irvine, in the City of Orange.

In early July 2018, UC Irvine removed benefactor Francisco J. Ayala's name from its biology school and central science library after an internal investigation by the university's Office of Equal Opportunity and Diversity substantiated a number of sexual harassment claims. Chancellor Gillman also authorized the removal of the Ayala name from graduate fellowships, scholar programs, and endowed chairs. Ayala resigned July 1, 2018 and was ordered to abstain from future university activities, following the university's consultative procedures that include a faculty review committee. The results from the investigation were compiled in a 97-page report, which included testimony from victims of Ayala.

Campus 

The layout of the core campus resembles a rough circle with its center being Aldrich Park (initially known as Central Park), lined up by the Ring Mall and buildings surrounding the road. To further emphasize the layout, academic units are positioned relative to the center, wherein undergraduate schools are closer to the center than the graduate schools.

Aldrich Park is planted with over 11,120 trees (there are over 24,000 trees on the entire campus), including 33 species of eucalyptus. Two ceremonial trees were planted in 1990, one for Arbor Day and the second for former chancellor Daniel Aldrich who had died that year. On the first anniversary of the September 11th tragedies, the chancellor planted a bay laurel tree in remembrance of the heroes and victims of the events of September 11, 2001. The tree itself was a gift from the UCI Staff Assembly. Aldrich Park is the site for "Wayzgoose", a medieval student festival held each year in conjunction with the "Celebrate UCI" open house. It also hosts many extracurricular activities.

Ring Mall is the main pedestrian road used by students and faculty to travel around the core campus. The road measures up to a perfect mile and completely encircles Aldrich Park. Most schools and libraries are lined up by this road with each of these schools having their own central plaza which also connects to the Aldrich Park.

Other areas of the university outside of the core campus such as the School of Arts are connected by four pedestrian bridges. Beyond the core campus and the bridges, the layout of the campus is more suburban.

Surroundings 

Irvine, California consistently ranks as the safest city in America. UCI is close to the beaches, mountains, and attractions of Southern California. Disneyland is approximately 20 minutes away by car. While the university is located in Irvine, the campus is directly bounded by the city of Newport Beach and the community of Newport Coast. The western side of the campus borders the San Diego Creek and the San Joaquin Freshwater Marsh Reserve, through which Campus Drive connects UCI to the 405 freeway. The northern and eastern sides of UCI are adjacent to Irvine proper; the eastern side of the campus is delineated by Bonita Canyon Road, which turns into Culver Drive at its northern terminus. California State Route 73 marks UCI's southern boundary and separates the campus from Newport Beach.

The "North Campus" houses the Facilities Management Department, the Faculty Research Facility, Central Receiving, Fleet Services, the Air Pollution Health Effects Laboratory, and numerous other functions.

William Pereira's original street layout for the region surrounding the University had a wingnut-shaped loop road as the main thoroughfare, which twice crossed the campus. However, the Irvine Company's development plans expanded before it could be completed, and portions of California, Carlson, Harvard and Turtle Rock roads today constitute segments of what would have been the Loop Road.

Despite the suburban environment, a variety of wildlife inhabits the university's central park, open fields, and wetlands. The university is home to cougar, hawks, golden eagles, great blue herons, squirrels, opossums, peregrine falcons, rabbits, raccoons, owls, skunks, weasels, bats, and coyotes. The UCI Arboretum hosts a collection of plants from California and Mediterranean climates around the world. The rabbits in particular can be seen across campus in high numbers, especially during hours of low student traffic.

Architecture 

The first buildings were designed by a team of architects led by William Pereira and including A. Quincy Jones and William Blurock. The initial landscaping, including Aldrich Park, was designed by an association of three firms, including that of the noted urban-landscaping innovator Robert Herrick Carter. Aldrich Park was designed under the direction of landscape architect Gene Uematsu, and was modeled after Frederick Law Olmsted's designs for New York City's Central Park. The campus opened in 1965 with the inner circle and park only half-completed. There were only nine buildings and a dirt road connecting the main campus to the housing units. Only three of the six "spokes" that radiate from the central park were built, with only two buildings each. Pereira was retained by the university to maintain a continuity of style among the buildings constructed in the inner ring around the park, the last of which was completed in 1972. These buildings were designed in a style which combined sweeping curves and expressionistic shapes with elements of classic California architecture such as red tiled roofs and clay-tiled walkways, and distinctive white railings evoking the deck of an ocean liner. These buildings featured an innovative structural design that freed the interiors from support columns to allow future alterations of their floor plans.

Construction on the campus all but ceased after the Administration building, Aldrich Hall, was completed in 1974, and then resumed in the late 1980s, beginning a massive building boom that still continues today. This second building boom continued the futuristic trend, but emphasized a much more colorful, postmodern approach that somewhat contradicted the earthy, organic designs of the early buildings. Architects such as Frank Gehry, Robert Venturi, Eric Owen Moss, James Stirling and Arthur Erickson were brought in to bring the campus more up to date. The recession in the early 1990s along with internal politics led to a change in direction, due to the reduced capital budget, and changing attitudes towards architectural innovation at the university. This, in turn, led to a "contextualist" approach beginning in the late 1990s combining stylistic elements of the first two phases in an attempt to provide an architectural "middle ground" between the two vastly different styles. Gehry's building was recently removed from campus to make way for a new building, with a design that has been called a "big beige box with bands of bricks". In 2009 the Humanities Gateway building, designed by Curtis W. Fentress, was opened. Its curvilinear design marked a return to the sculptural treatment of concrete begun by Pereira.

As of 2005, the campus has more than 200 buildings and encompasses most of the university's . The campus is in the midst of a $1.1 billion construction campaign.

Libraries and study centers 

In addition to holding a noted Critical Theory archive and Southeast Asian archive, the Libraries also contain extensive collections in Dance and Performing Arts, Regional History, and more. Additionally, Langson Library hosts an extensive East Asian collection with materials in Chinese, Japanese, and Korean.

Nearly all departments and schools on campus complement the resources of the UC Irvine Libraries by maintaining their own reading rooms and scholarly meeting rooms. They contain small reference collections and are the choice for more intimate lectures, graduate seminars, and study sessions. There is also the large Gateway Study Center located across from Langson Library, one of the university's original buildings and under the custody of UC Irvine Libraries. Having served formerly as a cafeteria and student center, it is now a dual-use computer lab and study area which is open nearly 24 hours.

The UCI Student Center offers a large number of study areas, auditoriums, and two food courts, and therefore is one of the most popular places to study on campus. UC Irvine also has a number of computer labs that serve as study centers. The School of Humanities maintains the Humanities Instructional Resource Center, a drop-in computer lab specializing in language and digital media. Additionally, UCI maintains five other drop-in labs, four instructional computer labs, and a number of reservation-only SmartClassrooms, some of which are open 24 hours. Other popular study areas include Aldrich Park, the Cross-Cultural Center, the Locus (a study room and computer lab used by the Campuswide Honors Program), and plazas located in every school.

Together, the UCI libraries have issued a land acknowledgement that the UCI campus is located on the traditional, ancestral, and unceded territories of the Acjachemen and Tongva.

Tunnels 
A network of tunnels runs between many of the major buildings on campus and the Central Plant, with the major trunk passage located beneath Ring Mall. Smaller tunnels branch off from this main passage to reach individual buildings, carrying electrical and air-conditioning utilities from the Central Plant. These tunnels have been the subject of much campus lore, the most popular story being that the tunnels were constructed to facilitate the safe evacuation of faculty in the event of a student riot. The main tunnel actually contains an above-ground section, in the form of the interior of an unusually thick pedestrian bridge near the Engineering Tower, in an area where the Ring Mall crosses between two hills. The tunnels are only accessible to maintenance staff, although there are also publicly accessible tunnels which intersect the utility tunnels, such as the one that goes between the main Information & Computer Science building and the Engineering Tower.

Governance 
Like other University of California campuses, UC Irvine operates under a system of shared governance, or a partnership between the Chancellor and his administration and the faculty through the Academic Senate. The Chancellor is the chief campus officer and has authority over the campus budget.  The Academic Senate has authority to determine the conditions for admission and supervise courses and curricula. The Chancellor is nominated by and is responsible to the Regents of the University of California and the UC President. UCI's Chancellors are listed below:
 1962 Daniel G. Aldrich
 1984 Jack W. Peltason
 1993 Laurel L. Wilkening
 1998 Ralph J. Cicerone
 2005 Michael V. Drake
 2014 Howard Gillman

After the Chancellor, the second most senior official is the Executive Vice Chancellor and Provost,   the university's chief academic and operating officer. Every school on campus reports to the Executive Vice Chancellor and Provost through a Dean, and all other academic and administrative units report to his office through a Vice Chancellor or chief administrator. A partial list of these units includes Campus Recreation, Intercollegiate Athletics, Planning and Budget, Student Affairs, UC Irvine Libraries, UC Irvine Medical Center, and University Advancement.

Academics

Academic units 

UC Irvine's academic units are referred to as Schools. As of the 2021-2022 school year, there are fourteen Schools, one Program in Public Health, and various interdisciplinary programs. The College of Health Sciences was established in 2004, but no longer exists as a separate academic unit. On November 16, 2006, the University of California Regents approved the establishment of the School of Law. The School of Education was established by the UC Regents in 2012. In 2016, the university announced that it had received a $40 million donation from Bill Gross' philanthropic foundation to turn its nursing science program into the Sue and Bill Gross School of Nursing. The UC Regents formally approved the establishment of the school in January 2017. In July 2020, the UC Regents approved the establishment of the School of Pharmacy and Pharmaceutical Sciences. Supplementary education programs offer accelerated or community education in the form of Summer Session and UC Irvine Extension.

The academic units consist of:
Claire Trevor School of the Arts
School of Biological Sciences
Paul Merage School of Business
School of Education
Henry Samueli School of Engineering
School of Humanities
Donald Bren School of Information & Computer Sciences
Interdisciplinary Studies
School of Law
School of Physical Sciences
School of Social Ecology
School of Social Sciences
School of Medicine
Sue & Bill Gross School of Nursing
School of Pharmacy & Pharmaceutical Sciences
Program in Public Health

Health care 
The School of Medicine constitute the professional schools of health science. UC Irvine Medical Center is ranked among the nation's top 50 hospitals by U.S. News & World Report for the 12th consecutive year. The School has 19 clinical and 6 basic science departments with 560 full-time and 1,300 volunteer faculty members involved in teaching, patient care and medical and basic science research.

Research organizations 
UCI's many research organizations are either chaired by or composed of UCI faculty, frequently draw upon undergraduates and graduates for research assistance, and produce innovations, patents, and scholarly works. Some are housed in a school or department office; others are housed in their own facilities. These are a few of the research organizations at UCI:
 Beckman Laser Institute
 California Institute for Telecommunications and Information Technology (Calit2)
Center for Chemistry at the Space-Time Limit (CaSTL Center)
Center for Complex Biological Systems
 Center for Global Peace and Conflict Studies
 Center for Cognitive Neuroscience
 Regional Center of Excellence for Biodefense and Emerging Infectious Disease (RCE)
 Center for Unconventional Security Affairs
 Chao Family Comprehensive Cancer Center
 Institute of Transportation Studies
 National Fuel Cell Research Center
 The Fleischman Lab
 Reeve-Irvine Research Center
 Center for the Study of Democracy
 Center for Health Policy Research
 W. M. Keck Center for Accelerator Mass Spectrometry
 Sue and Bill Gross Stem Cell Research Center
 Institute for Genomics and Bioinformatics (IGB)
 Center for Machine Learning and Data Mining (CML)
 University of California Transportation Center (UCTC)

Rankings

Global
Among universities under 50 years of age Times Higher Education ranked UCI 4th in the world and 1st in the US for 2012, 5th in the world and 1st in the US for 2013, 7th in the world and 1st in the US in 2014, and 7th in the world and 1st in the US in 2015. 2015 was the final year UCI was eligible for this ranking.

National

For 2021, U.S. News & World Report ranked UC Irvine tied for 35th among national universities in the U.S., tied for 8th among public universities, 2nd in "Top Performers on Social Mobility", tied for 42nd in "Most Innovative Schools", tied for 61st in "Best Undergraduate Teaching", and 175th in "Best Value Schools".

In 2019, Forbes ranked UCI 3rd out of the 300 Best Value Colleges, based on Return on Investment.

In 2017 Kiplinger ranked UCI 26th out of the top 100 best-value public colleges and universities in the nation, and 5th in California.

In 2018, Sierra Magazine ranked UCI 1st in its "Coolest Schools" in America list for campus sustainability and climate change efforts.

In addition, many of UCI's graduate programs are ranked in the top 50 of the 2020 U.S. News & World Report rankings: literary criticism and theory (1), criminology (3), organic chemistry (10), English (17), chemistry (20), sociology (23), computer science (30), physics (28), psychology (36), law (21), education (24), biological sciences (33), earth sciences (41), history (34), engineering (35), business part-time MBA (32), political science (45), mathematics (39), medicine-research (46), and economics (47).

Learned societies affiliations
UCI faculty are affiliated with the following learned societies.
 American Academy of Arts and Sciences (32 members)
 American Association for the Advancement of Science (115 members)
 American Philosophical Society (11 members)
 American Physical Society (30 members)
 Howard Hughes Medical Institute (1 members)
 American Psychological Association (20 members)
 National Academy of Medicine (5 members)
 National Academy of Engineering (11 members)
 National Academy of Sciences (32 members)
 National Academy of Education (4 members)

Admissions 
UC Irvine is categorized by U.S. News & World Report as "most selective" for college admissions in the United States. It was the third-most selective University of California campus for the freshman class entering in the fall of 2019, as measured by the ratio of admitted students to applicants (behind UC Berkeley and UCLA). UC Irvine received 95,566 applications for admission to the fall 2019 incoming freshman class and 25,394 were admitted, making UC Irvine's acceptance rate 26.6% for fall 2019. The middle 50% range for SAT scores of fall 2019 enrolled freshmen were 650-790 for math and 600-720 for evidence based reading and writing. The incoming 2018 freshmen were predominantly from Los Angeles County, followed by Orange County, the Bay Area counties, San Bernardino County, Riverside County, and San Diego County.

The most popular major for freshmen is a major in the School of Biological Sciences (22%), followed by Undecided/Undeclared (20.6%), Social Sciences (17.4%), Engineering (11.7%), Humanities (8.8%), Physical Sciences (6.1%), Arts (5%), Social Ecology (5%), Information and Computer Sciences (3%), and Health Sciences (0.2%). The average freshman's incoming high school GPA was 3.95. The average SAT scores were 602 (Critical Reasoning), 640 (Mathematics), and 612 (Writing), while the ACT composite score was 26. SAT verbal scores for the middle 50% were 550 and 660, while SAT math scores ranged between 580 and 700.

The choice to offer admission is based on the University of California's comprehensive review program, which considers a candidate's personal situation, community involvement, extracurricular activities, and academic potential in addition to the traditional high school academic record, personal statement, and entrance examination scores. While residency is not a factor in admission, it is a factor in tuition expenses, with out-of-state residents fees much greater than California residents. Since the approval of Proposition 209 in November 1996, California state law has prohibited all public universities (including UC Irvine) from practicing affirmative action as part of their admissions processes.

Discoveries and innovation

Machine Learning Repository 
The University of California Irvine hosts the UCI Machine Learning Repository, a data resource which is very popular among machine learning researchers and data mining practitioners. It was created in 1987 and contains almost 500 datasets from several domains including biology, medicine, physics, engineering, social sciences, games, and others. The datasets contained in the UC Irvine Machine Learning Repository have been used by thousands of students and researchers in the computer science community and facilitated the publication of approximately 26 thousand scientific articles.

Student life

Fraternities and sororities 
The first fraternities and sororities at UCI began in 1973 with three sororities (Delta Gamma, Pi Beta Phi, and Gamma Phi Beta) and three fraternities (Beta Theta Pi, Sigma Chi, and Phi Delta Theta). Major events and programs in the Greek Community include Songfest, All Greek Conference, Greek Week, BANG (Being a New Greek), and risk management programs (topics vary).

Clubs and organizations 
With over 650 student clubs and organizations on campus, students can readily find friends who share their interests, whether academic, multicultural, political, religious, service, social, or athletic. Campus activities throughout the year include cultural nights, arts performances, and live music at Anteater Plaz. Special events such as Summerlands, Wayzgoose, Shocktoberfest, Soulstice, and Earth Day are held yearly. ASUCI, the university's undergraduate student government, traditionally organizes a world record attempt by the university at the beginning of each academic year. UCI has won Guinness World Records for the largest game of capture the flag six times, with the most recent one in September 2015. In addition, the university has broken the record for the largest game of dodgeball three years straight. They have also won records for largest water pistol fight and largest pillow fight.

On November 30, 2007, the Office of Civil Rights of the United States Department of Education issued a report finding insufficient evidence in support of allegations that Jewish students at UCI were harassed and subjected to a hostile environment based on their religious beliefs. The agency ultimately found that none of the incidents leading to the allegations qualified as "sufficiently severe, pervasive or persistent as to interfere with or limit the ability of an individual to participate in from the services, activities or privileges" provided by UCI, and that university officials had acted appropriately in response to each incident. In December 2007, UCI Administration was cleared of anti-semitism complaints by the US Department of Education's Office for Civil Rights. Following a speech by Chancellor Drake at the national Hillel meeting in Washington, D.C. in March 2008, Anteaters for Israel, along with three other Jewish organizations, issued a press release defending Drake and claiming that anti-Semitic activity was "exaggerated".

Irvine 11 controversy 

In 2010, eleven students from the Muslim Student Union staged a protest against a speech by Israeli Ambassador Michael Oren by disrupting it several times. The students and the student's union involved were first disciplined by UCI and then had criminal charges brought against them. They were convicted of misdemeanor charges and sentenced to three years probation, community service, and fines. This led to a debate on whether the students' protest was free speech and whether filing criminal charges against them was fair after UCI had already disciplined them. Critics argued that the students were victims of selective prosecution and that they were targeted because they were Muslims and supported the Palestinians.

Residential accommodations 

UC Irvine has a number of residential options for students interested in living on campus. Part of UCI's long-range development plan involves expanding on-campus housing to accommodate 50% of all UCI students.

The on-campus housing communities for undergraduates are: Mesa Court, Middle Earth, Arroyo Vista, Campus Village, Vista del Campo, Vista del Campo Norte, Camino del Sol, Puerta del Sol, and Plaza Verde. Graduate students also have access to the on-campus housing communities: Palo Verde and Verano Place.

UCI's two freshman dormitory communities are Mesa Court and Middle Earth. Mesa Court was the first housing community at UCI, and features a volleyball court, two basketball courts, a community center, a recreational center, and the Mesa Academic Center (MAC). Middle Earth comprises 24 residence halls, one dining facility (Brandywine), a student center, and several resource centers. Each building in Middle Earth is named after a character or a place from J.R.R. Tolkien's The Hobbit and The Lord of the Rings. Middle Earth was built in three phases. The first phase was built in 1974 and includes seven halls: Hobbiton, Isengard, Lorien, Mirkwood, Misty Mountain, Rivendell, and the Shire, along with a separate Head Resident's manufactured home called "Bag End". The second phase was built in 1989 with thirteen more halls: Balin, Harrowdale, Whispering Wood, Woodhall, Calmindon, Grey Havens, Aldor, Rohan, Gondolin, Snowbourn, Elrond, Shadowfax, and Quenya. The third phase was built in 2000 with four halls: Crickhollow, Evenstar, Oakenshield, and Valimar. Each hall houses about fifty to eighty students, although Quenya was built with sixty single suite rooms which mainly house graduate students. In 2019, two Middle Earth towers were built, which are called Telperion and Laurelin. These towers house around 470 undergraduate students.

There are 42 houses located in Arroyo Vista, of which nine are sorority houses and four are fraternity houses. The sorority houses located in Arroyo Vista are Alpha Phi, Delta Delta Delta, Delta Gamma, Gamma Phi Beta, Pi Beta Phi, Alpha Chi Omega, and Kappa Alpha Theta. The fraternity houses located in Arroyo Vista are Sigma Phi Epsilon, Sigma Chi, Phi Gamma Delta, and Kappa Sigma. Arroyo Vista also features many themed houses based on academic or social interests. In the fall of 2012, Arroyo Vista started the "First Year Experience" and now houses first year students within six of its houses. Students living in Arroyo Vista live in complexes that may be called houses, but have dorm-like qualities.

Apartment-style on-campus housing at UCI can be found at Vista del Campo, Vista del Campo Norte, Camino del Sol, and Puerta del Sol. VDC has single rooms available for undergraduates, while VDC Norte has both single rooms and double rooms available. Camino del Sol features single rooms, a community center, a fitness center, and a pool. In the fall of 2012, Camino del Sol opened housing to incoming first-year students as an option instead of dorm living. Each housing community is served by ASUCI shuttles that regularly travel to the main campus. It has three stories and was designed with capacity for 1,198 beds, in 331 units ranging in size from 1,118-1,499 sq. ft.

UCI off-campus housing options vary, based on a student's preferred living arrangements and budget. However, a common denominator for off-campus apartment housing in Irvine is the fact that most accommodations are maintained by The Irvine Company (also true in nearby Newport Beach and Tustin to a lesser extent).

Athletics 

UC Irvine's sports teams are known as the Anteaters and the student body is known as Antourage. They currently participate in the NCAA's Division I, as members of the Big West Conference and the Mountain Pacific Sports Federation. In the early years of the school's existence, the teams participated at the NCAA Division II level with great success as explained in the UC Irvine Anteaters page.  UC Irvine fields nationally competitive teams in baseball, basketball, cross country, golf, soccer, track and field, volleyball and water polo. The university has won 28 national championships in nine different sports, and fielded 64 individual national champions, 53 Olympians and over 500 All-Americans.

The university's most recent NCAA Division I national championship was won by the men's volleyball team in 2013. UC Irvine men's volleyball won four national championships in 2007, 2009, 2012 and 2013.

UC Irvine won three NCAA Division I men's water polo titles, with championships in 1970, 1982 and 1989.

UC Irvine Anteaters baseball won back-to-back national championships at the NCAA College Division College World Series and the NCAA Division II College World Series in 1973 and 1974. Anteater baseball moved to the NCAA Division I level. The 2007 baseball team finished 3rd at the College World Series, and in 2009 the baseball team earned a No. 1 national ranking in NCAA Division I polls from Baseball America and Collegiate Baseball for the first time, as well as a national seed and the right to host an NCAA Regional. The 2014 baseball team returned to the College World Series and finished 5th.

UCI Anteater's golf team won the NCAA Division II national team championship in 1975 with team member Jerry Wisz winning the individual title. At the NCAA national championships in 1973, 1974 and 1976, those teams finished second twice and fourth the other year. These teams included seven All-Americans.

In 2015, for the first time, the UC Irvine Anteaters men's basketball team appeared in the Division I tournament. It was narrowly defeated in a first-round tournament game by Louisville. The Anteaters made their second NCAA appearance in 2019, beating fourth-seed Kansas State University for their first March Madness win ever.

Anteater as mascot 
The anteater was chosen in 1965 when students were allowed to submit mascot candidates, which would be voted on in a campus election. Three undergraduates named Pat Glasgow, Bob Ernst, and Schuyler Hadley Basset III were credited with choosing the anteater and designing a cartoon representation, having been disappointed with other candidates such as a roadrunner, unicorn, seahawk and golden bison.

While often attributed to the Johnny Hart comic strip B.C., the original anteater design was based on the Playboy bunny. In November 1965, the UCI students officially voted on the anteater. In a special follow-up election, students opted for a mascot based on the B.C. anteater over the Playboy version.

A hand signal called "Rip'em 'Eaters" was created by Blake Sasaki and Dennis Wisco in 2001. When attacked, an anteater sits in a tripodal position with its hind feet and tail and tears and "rips" at its predator. The hand signal is done by touching the tips of the two middle fingers with the thumb, and sliding the thumb back, making the pinky and index finger the ears and the fingers in the middle the snout of the anteater.

In August 2007, a small stuffed anteater accompanied astronaut Tracy Caldwell on Space Shuttle Endeavour mission STS-118.

Following the 2015 men's basketball team's inaugural appearance in the NCAA Division I tournament, Mashable named Peter the Anteater the winner of its "Mascot Madness" tournament. The mascot also appeared on an episode of Conan.

People 

UC Irvine has more than 200,000 living alumni. These include astronauts (Tracy Caldwell Dyson), athletes (Steve Scott, Scott Brooks, Greg Louganis and 53 Olympians), Broadway, film, and television actors (Bob Gunton, James LeGros, Jon Lovitz, Brian Thompson, Teal Wicks, Windell Middlebrooks), technological innovators (Roy Fielding, Paul Mockapetris, and Patrick J. Hanratty), educators (Erin Gruwell), musicians (Kevin Kwan Loucks), and scientists (Mika Tosca).

Eight people affiliated with UCI have been honored with the Nobel Prize. In 1995, professor Frank Sherwood Rowland won the Nobel Prize in Chemistry and Frederick Reines won the Nobel Prize in Physics. Rowland helped to discover the harmful effects of CFCs on the ozone layer, while Reines received the Nobel Prize for his work in discovering the neutrino. In 2004, Irwin Rose, a professor at the School of Medicine, was awarded the Nobel Prize in Chemistry along with two professors from the Technion for the discovery of ubiquitin-mediated protein degradation. In 2021, alumnus David MacMillan was awarded the Nobel Prize in Chemistry for the development of asymmetric organocatalysis.

Seven Pulitzer Prize winners have been associated with UCI, including three faculty members and four alumni. These include Michael Chabon, who won the Pulitzer Prize for Fiction in 2001 for The Amazing Adventures of Kavalier & Clay, and Richard Ford, who won the Pulitzer Prize for Fiction in 1996 for Independence Day. Claude Yarbrough (aka Jonathan Pendragon), class of '76, is one of the most influential magicians of the 20th and 21st centuries. Thomas Keneally was a visiting professor at UCI in 1985 (when he taught the graduate fiction workshop) and again from 1991 to 1995 (when he was a visiting professor in the writing program). Keneally is most famous for his book Schindler's Ark (1982) (later republished as Schindler's List), which won the Booker Prize and is the basis of the film Schindler's List that was directed by Steven Spielberg.

Jacques Derrida, a philosopher most commonly associated with postmodern and post-structuralist philosophy, taught at the University of California, Irvine from 1986 to shortly before his death in 2004; his colleague, Jean-François Lyotard, also taught at UCI from 1987 until 1994. Ralph J. Cicerone, an earth system science professor and former chancellor of UCI, served as president of the National Academy of Sciences from 2005 to 2016.

Three UCI faculty members have been named National Medal of Science recipients. In January 2009, UCI Professor Reg Penner won the Faraday Medal for his research with nanowires.

See also 
 Anteater Recreation Center
 Center for Chemistry at the Space-Time Limit

Notes

References

External links 

 
 UC Irvine athletics website

 
Education in Irvine, California
Organizations based in Irvine, California
Schools accredited by the Western Association of Schools and Colleges
Universities and colleges in Orange County, California
Land-grant universities and colleges
Educational institutions established in 1965
1965 establishments in California
University of California, Irvine
Irvine